Mitsusuke (written: 満祐 or 光祐) is a masculine Japanese given name. Notable people with the name include:

 (1381–1441), Japanese daimyō
 (born 1928), Japanese karateka
 (1675–1710), Japanese artist

Japanese masculine given names